Zip Coon may refer to:
Zip Coon, a blackface minstrel show character
Zip Coon, a song